The Tbilisi State Academy of Arts is one of the oldest universities in Georgia and Caucasus. It is located in central Tbilisi near the Tbilisi Opera and Ballet Theatre  on Rustaveli avenue.

Dating from the 1850s, the Tbilisi State Academy of Art building is one of the most outstanding heritage sites in Tbilisi.  Defined by an eclectic mix of European and oriental architectural and artistic styles, this landmark building is best known for the so-called Mirror Halls, the sumptuous adornment of which, executed by Qajar artists invited from Iran, are reminiscent of the decoration of oriental palaces.

History 
Based on the resolution of the People's Commissariat on Education of 8 March 1922, the Art Academy of Georgia was founded. Four faculties were established, those of painting, sculpture, graphic arts and architecture. In 1927 the department of ceramics was added. In 1922 Mose Toidze founded an art school providing training to the young people wishing to enter the Academy. The Academy is housed in the former Vardan Arshakuni mansion, completely reconstructed and refurbished by the architect Simon Kldiashvili in 1902.
 
From the beginning, the teachers and professors of the academy were renowned artists; the first were Gigo Gabashvili, Iakob Nikoladze, Eugene Lanceray, Joseph Sharlemagne, Henryk Hryniewski, Egishe Tatevosyan, Nikolay Sklifosovskiy, Nicholas Antadze, Anatoli Kalgin, Nikolay Severove, Dimitri Shevardnadze, Michael Machavariani, Alexander Pitskhelauri, Michael Khananashvili, Boris Shebuev, Mose Toidze, Alexander Tsimakuridze, Nicholas Kandelaki, Valerian Sidamon-Eristavi, David Kakabadze, Lado Gudiashvili, George Sesiashvili, Ucha Japaridze, Shalva Amiranashvili, Apollon Kutateladze, Vasili Shukhaev, Sergo Kobuladze, Silovan Kakabadze, Shota Mikatadze, David Tsitsishvili, Zakro Maisuradze, and Lado Grigolia.

The Tbilisi State Academy of Arts is located in the former “House of Arshakuni”, since 1922 (architect G. Ivanov. 1856). The interiors were designed  by Iranian masters (in Qajar art style) who were working in Tbilisi. In the same building (till 1937) there were placed the Ballet studio (the Mirror Hall) of Maria Perini, the spouse of an artist Henryk Hryniewski, as well as his own art studio; Studio of the academy professor – Gigo Gabashvili; and Kobulashvili family flats.
In 1972 the new ten-floor academy block was built (architects A.Kurdiani, M. Chkhikvadze, L. Sumbadze, constructor D. Kajaia). In 2005–2006 the new block was restored by Cartu Bank .

Faculties
Visual Arts - Dean Megi Tsitlidze 
Media Arts - Dean Nana Iashvili
Design - Dean Giorgi Iashvili
Architecture - Dean Irakli Pirmisashvili
Restoration, Art History and Theory - Dean Tamara Khundadze

All educational programs at the Tbilisi State Academy of Arts are conducted in the Georgian language. For applicants with a foreign upper-secondary school education that lack qualifications in Georgian a language test is required.

Rectors
1922–1926 – Giorgi Chubinashvili
1927–1930 – Alexander Duduchava
1930–1932 – Vakhtang Kotetishvili
1932–1936 – Grigol Bukhnikashvili
1936–1942 – Silovan Kakabadze
1942–1948 – Ucha Japaridze
1948–1952 – Mamia Duduchava
1952–1959 – Sergo Kobuladze
1959–1972 – Apollon Kutateladze
1972–1982 – Giorgi Totibadze
1982–1987 – Zurab Nizharadze
1987–1992 – Tengiz Peradze
1992–2003 – Soso Koyava
2003–2012 – Gia Bugadze
2012-2012 - Irena Popiashvili
2012–2014 – Tinatin Kldiashvili
2014–2022 – Gia Gugushvili
2022-to present - Karaman Kutateladze

Exhibitions
The academy operates the following exhibition spaces:
 Museum  – includes 618 paintings, course and diploma artworks. Among them are art-pieces by Gigo Gabashvili (8 works), Elene Akhvlediani, Ludwig Luigi Longo, Kirill Zdanevich, Tamara Balanchivadze, Mose Toidze, Aleksander Tsimakuridze, Korneli Sanadze, Reno Turkia, Koki Makharadze 
 Tapestry Museum on Shardin street

References

 თბილისის სახელმწიფო სამხატვრო აკადემია (The Tbilisi State Academy of Arts).Tbilisi 2002. .  
 საქართველოს ძველი ქალაქები: თბილისი (second ed.). 2006. .  
 თბილისის სახელმწიფო სამხატვრო აკადემია (The Tbilisi State Academy of Arts). Tbilisi 2011. .

External links 
 

 
Art schools in Georgia (country)
Universities in Georgia (country)
Culture in Tbilisi
Education in Tbilisi
Fashion schools
Design schools
Buildings and structures in Tbilisi
Educational institutions established in 1922
1922 establishments in Georgia (country)